The voiceless retroflex sibilant affricate is a type of consonantal sound, used in some spoken languages.

The affricate occurs in a number of languages:
Asturian: Speakers of the western dialects of this language use it instead of the voiced palatal fricative, writing ḷḷ instead of ll.
Slavic languages: Polish, Belarusian, Old Czech, Serbo-Croatian; some speakers of Russian may use it instead of the voiceless alveolo-palatal affricate.
a number of Northwest Caucasian languages have retroflex affricates that contrast in secondary articulations like labialization.
Mandarin and other Sinitic languages.

Features
Features of the voiceless retroflex affricate:

Occurrence

See also
Index of phonetics articles

Notes

References

External links
 

Alveolar consonants
Affricates
Pulmonic consonants
Voiceless oral consonants
Central consonants